Iwindi is an administrative ward in the Mbeya Rural district of the Mbeya Region of Tanzania. In 2016 the Tanzania National Bureau of Statistics report there were 20,276 people in the ward, from 18,397 in 2012.

Villages and hamlets 
The ward has 10 villages, and 57 hamlets.

 Iwindi
 Igawilo
 Ihobha
 Ijombe
 Ipipa
 Isanga
 Iwindi
 Nshala
 Usahandeshe
 Igonyamu
 Gezatulolane
 Igonyamu
 Lyanda mpalala
 Mazoha
 Nsalafu
 Nsega
 Sahandeshe
 Inolo
 Iduji
 Inolo
 Kasalia
 Isangala
 Igagu
 Igosa
 Isangala kati
 Iwe
 Madindika
 Mande
 Nzinga
 Itimu
 Igombe
 Itimu
 Msituni
 Mwambale
 Mwansita
 Njiapanda
 Maganjo
 Barabarani
 Maganjo
 Makatani
 Mbilwa
 Mjimwema
 Mlimani
 Mwampalala
 Iwuzi
 Lusungo
 Majengo
 Masebe
 Mwambale
 Nsenga
 Sibudwa
 Mwaselela
 Isanga B
 Iwanga
 Mwaselela
 Shizi
 Tazama
 Mwashiwawala
 2Mina
 Lusungo
 Mwashiwawala
 Nsongole
 Relini
 Nsambya
 Ilindi A
 Ilindi B
 Nsambya

References 

Wards of Mbeya Region